Henry Brooks may refer to:

 Henry Jamyn Brooks (1839–1925), British painter
 Henry Luesing Brooks (1905–1971), United States federal judge
 Henry Sands Brooks (1772–1833), American clothier

See also 
 Harry Brooks (disambiguation)
 Henry Brook (disambiguation)